Podjuchy is a municipal neighborhood of the city of Szczecin, Poland situated on the right bank of the East Oder river, south-east of the Szczecin Old Town, and south-west of Szczecin-Dąbie.

Before 1945 when Stettin was a part of Germany, the German name of this suburb was Stettin-Podejuch.

Notable residents
 Manfred Ewald (1926–2002), German Democratic Republic's minister of sport and president East German Olympic committee

Neighbourhoods of Szczecin